Ian Almond (born 1969) is a literary scholar. He is professor of world literature at Georgetown University School of Foreign Service in Qatar.

Biography 
Ian Almond was born in 1969 in Skipton, England. He received his PhD in literature at Edinburgh University, and worked for University of Bari in Italy, Erciyes University and Boğaziçi University in Turkey, Frei University in Germany, and Georgia State University in the USA, before coming to Georgetown University School of Foreign Service Qatar in 2013.

Almond specializes in post-colonial theory, South Asian literature, representations of Islam and world literature. His works primarily focus on Islam. He is interested in showing how Islam has been an overlooked factor in the formation of Europe. His book Two Faiths, One Banner: When Muslims marched with Christians across Europe's battlegrounds is a history of Muslim-Christian military alliances in Europe.

Almond theorizes in History of Islam in German Thought from Leibniz to Nietzsche that Marx, Hegel, Nietzsche and Kant knew more about Islam than conventionally assumed. In his work on philosophy, he argues that many postmodernists rely on an Orientalist tropes in writing about Islam. His works seek to explore the repressed spirituality of allegedly secular authors.

He is the author of five books. His books have been translated into several languages, including Arabic, Turkish, Persian, Korean, Indonesian and Bosnian.
The Arabic translation of his book Sufism and Deconstruction was shortlisted among seven other books for the Sheikh Zayed Book Prize.

Bibliography

 Sufism and Deconstruction: A Comparative Study of Derrida and Ibn ʻArabi. New York; London: Routledge, 2004.
 The New Orientalists: Postmodern Representations of Islam from Foucault to Baudrillard. London: I.B. Tauris, 2007 
 Two Faiths, One Banner: When Muslims marched with Christians across Europe's battlegrounds. Cambridge, Mass.: Harvard University Press, 2009.
 History of Islam in German Thought from Leibniz to Nietzsche. New York: Routledge, 2010.
 The Thought of Nirad C. Chaudhuri. London: Cambridge University Press, 2015. 
World Literature Decentered: Beyond the “West” Through Turkey, Mexico and Bengal. Routledge, 2021. ISBN 9780367683375

References

External links
 Google scholar page
 http://www.english.gsu.edu/9694.html
 https://www1-georgetown.academia.edu/IanAlmond
 http://www.hup.harvard.edu/catalog.php?isbn=9780674061767

1969 births
Living people
People from Skipton
Alumni of the University of Edinburgh
Academic staff of Boğaziçi University
Georgia State University faculty
British Islamic studies scholars
Ibn Arabi scholars
British historians